The Basketball Wales National League, or BWNL for short, is a league competition for basketball clubs from Wales.

History
The league was formed in 2021 by Basketball Wales, the governing body of the sport in Wales, to increase interest and competitive standards in the country.

Wales was the only remaining home nation member of British Basketball not to run a national league. The new competition would bring it in line with the National Basketball League and the Scottish Basketball Championship, behind the British Basketball League, the top tier professional league in Great Britain.

Welsh teams have historically competed in the North Wales Basketball League, the South Wales Basketball League or the National Basketball League in England. For the inaugural season, teams also continued to compete in their previous league competitions.

In September 2021, the first eight teams to compete in the new competition were announced.

Teams
Current teams

Former teams

Seasons

2022-23
Teams

Group A

Group B

Plate

Cup

Semi-finals

Final

2021-22
Teams

Group A

Group B

Plate

Cup

Semi-finals

Final

Final ranking

References

Sports leagues established in 2021
2021 establishments in Wales